Attorney General Patterson may refer to:

John Malcolm Patterson (1921–2021), Attorney General of Alabama
Joseph Turner Patterson (1907–1969), Attorney General of Mississippi

See also
William Paterson (judge) (1745–1806), Attorney General of New Jersey